Aimar Olaizola Apezetxea, known as Olaizola II is a pelotari, brother of Olaizola I.

Early life 
Olaizola started to play pelota on the local fronton of his hometown, Goizueta, Navarre.

Professional career 
During his career, Olaizola II won in 2005, 2007, 2012 and 2013 the main hand-pelota championship — the singles championship — additionally reaching the finals of 2003, 2006, 2009 and 2015.

1st hand-pelota singles championship finals

Cuatro y Medio championship finals

1st hand-pelota doubles championship finals

2nd Hand-Pelota singles championship

(1) Two championships were played in 1999, due to disagreements between the two main professional Basque-pelota companies — Aspe and Asegarce.

Sources & references 
  Olaizola II profile

1979 births
Living people
People from Norte de Aralar
Spanish pelotaris
Pelotaris from Navarre